Cesar Javier Montiglio (born August 22, 1984 in Yerba Buena, Tucumán) is an Argentine footballer who currently plays as right winger for Juventud Antoniana.

Career
Born in Tucumán Province, Montiglio began playing professional football with local side Club Atlético Tucumán. He made appearances for the club in Torneo Argentino A, Primera B Nacional and the Argentine Primera División. Former manager Héctor Rivoira signed him on loan at Club Atlético Huracán in June 2010.

Teams

References 

 

1984 births
Living people
Argentine footballers
Sportspeople from Tucumán Province
Association footballers not categorized by position
Atlético Tucumán footballers
Club Atlético Huracán footballers